Samuel V. Woods was the Democratic President of the West Virginia Senate from Barbour County and served from 1913 to 1915. He was the son of West Virginia Supreme Court judge, Samuel Woods. He was born on 13 August 1856 in Barbour County. He is an alumnus of West Virginia University.

References

External links
Portrait of Samuel V. Woods of Charleston, W. Va.

West Virginia state senators
Presidents of the West Virginia State Senate
Year of death missing
Year of birth missing